Andrej Nedorost (born April 30, 1980) is a Slovak former professional ice hockey player. He played 28 games in the National Hockey League with the Columbus Blue Jackets between 2001 and 2003. The rest of his career, which lasted from 1998 to 2015, was mainly spent in various European leagues. Internationally Nedorost played for the Slovakian national team at the 2001 World Championships.

Biography
Nedorost was born in Trenčín, Czechoslovakia. As a youth, he played in the 1994 Quebec International Pee-Wee Hockey Tournament with a team from Bratislava.

He played 28 games in the National Hockey League with the Columbus Blue Jackets. On 25 September 2008, he moved from Czech Republic team HC Slovan Ústí nad Labem to HC Dukla Trenčín in Slovakia. He later played for Yertis Pavlodar of the Kazakhstan Hockey Championship.

Career statistics

Regular season and playoffs

International

References

External links
 

1980 births
Living people
Columbus Blue Jackets draft picks
Columbus Blue Jackets players
Essen Mosquitoes players
Hamburg Freezers players
HC Berkut-Kyiv players
HC Karlovy Vary players
HC Neftekhimik Nizhnekamsk players
HC Plzeň players
HC Slovan Bratislava players
HC Slovan Ústečtí Lvi players
HK Dukla Trenčín players
HK Poprad players
IHC Písek players
Malmö Redhawks players
Metallurg Magnitogorsk players
Motor České Budějovice players
Sportspeople from Trenčín
Skellefteå AIK players
Slovak ice hockey centres
Syracuse Crunch players
VEU Feldkirch players
Yertis Pavlodar players
Slovak expatriate ice hockey players in the Czech Republic
Slovak expatriate ice hockey players in the United States
Slovak expatriate sportspeople in Ukraine
Slovak expatriate sportspeople in Kazakhstan
Slovak expatriate sportspeople in Austria
Slovak expatriate ice hockey players in Germany
Slovak expatriate ice hockey players in Russia
Slovak expatriate ice hockey players in Sweden
Expatriate ice hockey players in Kazakhstan
Expatriate ice hockey players in Ukraine